Len Sutton (August 9, 1925 – December 3, 2006) was an American racecar driver. He is best known for finishing second at the 1962 Indianapolis 500.

Early racing career
A lifelong resident of Portland, Oregon, Sutton became involved in auto racing after serving in the Navy during World War II. He spun out in the first corner on his first lap at a dirt track. Sutton won Oregon Racing Association championships in 1949, 1950, 1954, and 1955. He flipped his car to avoid cattle during the 1954 Carrera Panamericana road race (now Baja 1000). He was in a body cast for  4 months. He also won midget car racing championships in Portland before he headed east to become a national touring driver.

National circuits
He raced in the AAA and USAC Championship Car series from 1955 to 1965, with 76 career starts, 43 top ten finishes, and 3 victories.

Sutton completed his rookie test for the Indianapolis 500 in 1956. He flipped his car while attempting 140 miles per hour for the 1957 Indianapolis 500. He slide upside down with his helmet scraping the asphalt for nearly 1000 feet (300 m). A report in the following day's Indianapolis News said "Sutton was at first believed dead by observers on the scene." His injuries included broken shoulder, serious abrasions on his back, and a fractured skull. He returned to Indianapolis the following year and made his first start in the event. That year he finished 32nd after being eliminated in a multi-car accident during the first lap.  He competed in the 500 six more times and had his best result in 1962.  After starting the race 4th, he led 9 laps and finished second behind his teammate Rodger Ward.  The next year, he set an unofficial Indianapolis Motor Speedway record when he went over  during a tire test.

Known for his versatility as a driver, Sutton also competed in roadsters, midgets, sprint cars, and stock cars.  He finished 31st in the 1963 Daytona 500. Sutton decided to retire from driving during a 1965 race at Langhorne Speedway. Fellow competitor Mel Kenyon was severely burned in the race.

Broadcaster after retirement and death
After retiring from driving, Sutton went into broadcasting and was a member of the Indianapolis Motor Speedway Radio Network for many years.

Sutton died at his home in Portland at age 81 after a long battle with cancer.

Awards
He was inducted in the West Coast Stock Car Hall of Fame in 2005. He was a member of the Oregon Sports Hall of Fame. Sutton was named to the National Midget Auto Racing Hall of Fame in 2009.

Complete AAA/USAC Championship Car results

Indianapolis 500 results

World Championship career summary
The Indianapolis 500 was part of the FIA World Championship from 1950 through 1960. Drivers competing at Indy during those years were credited with World Championship points and participation. Len Sutton participated in 3 World Championship races but scored no World Championship points.

References

Auto racing loses a gentleman
Popular Indianapolis 500 Driver Sutton Dies At Age 81

1925 births
2006 deaths
Deaths from cancer in Oregon
Indianapolis 500 drivers
Racing drivers from Portland, Oregon
United States Navy personnel of World War II
USAC Stock Car drivers